Fehmi Koç (born 28 August 2003) is a Turkish professional footballer who plays as a midfielder for the TFF Third League club Kepez Belediyespor on loan from Antalyaspor.

Professional career
Koç made his professional debut with Antalyaspor in a 0–0 Süper Lig with Fenerbahçe on 24 December 2018. Aged just 15 years, 7 months, and 3 days in his debut, Koç is the youngest ever player in the history of the Süper Lig.

He has suffered an ACL tear about a month later in January 2019 and has not recovered as of November 2019.

References

External links
 
 
 

2003 births
Living people
Sportspeople from Antalya
Turkish footballers
Turkey youth international footballers
Association football midfielders
Antalyaspor footballers
Süper Lig players
TFF Third League players